The 1990–91 Illinois Fighting Illini men's basketball team represented the University of Illinois.

Regular season
Entering the 1990–91 season, Illinois, faced with the loss of Kendall Gill, Steve Bardo and Marcus Liberty, who declared himself eligible for the NBA draft after his junior season, was picked to finish as low as ninth in the Big Ten by some publications. But, junior forward Andy Kaufmann burst onto the scene scoring 660 points, the second largest single-season total in Illinois history. He and
the Illini proved the preseason expectations wrong by going 21-10 and finishing third in the Big Ten.

Roster

Source

Schedule
												
Source																
												

|-
!colspan=12 style="background:#DF4E38; color:white;"| Non-Conference regular season

	

|-
!colspan=9 style="background:#DF4E38; color:#FFFFFF;"|Big Ten regular season

|-

Player stats

Awards and honors
 Deon Thomas
Fighting Illini All-Century team (2005)
Andy Kpedi
Team Most Valuable Player

NCAA basketball tournament
Ineligible due to NCAA violations

Team players drafted into the NBA

Rankings

References

Illinois Fighting Illini
Illinois Fighting Illini men's basketball seasons
1990 in sports in Illinois
1991 in sports in Illinois